Purple rock crab is a common name which may apply to any of the following crab species:
Leptograpsus variegatus
Hemigrapsus sexdentatus

Animal common name disambiguation pages